Sabriya is an Uzbek TV-series that was premiered on 30 November 2021 on SevimliTV.

Plot

Cast

General view

Episodes

Reviews 

Saida Mirziyoyeva, Deputy Chairwoman of the Board of Trustees of the Public Foundation for Support and Development of National Mass media, Member of the Commission on Ensuring Gender Equality of the Republic of Uzbekistan, said,

"I will use my viewer's right to express my attitude towards the drama Sabriya. I'm sure there isn't a single woman among the creators of the drama. Because I've never seen so much hate for women in a script in any movie. It is not clear why the plot contains complete and correct instructions for taking drugs? In this case, no consequences are presented. The most unpleasant and disgusting are the scenes of violence against women; and as the only way out of the situation - to commit suicide. "Excellent" recommendation! 

Feature films are one of the ways to shape the modern agenda in society. We are making incredible efforts to ensure that gender equality and respect for women will become the norm in our society. Each of us, the owner of the audience, has a great responsibility for this word. However, such serials hinder the development of gender equality. There are no solid thoughts in them, only painful fantasies about the life of Uzbekistan.

Our women do not deserve such an attitude from the cinema. Neither private nor general!"

Amira Rashidova, one of the producers of Sevimli TV, commented

“Only one trailer was distributed. In a joint trailer, a drug addict tries to inflict violence on a woman. In this trailer, the director filmed the episode without blood, body exposure, and physical violence. No explicit violence or vulgar scenes are shown. According to the scenario, the criminal in the same episode receives punishment for his actions. We don't live in a time where we can't show bad people, they are still exist. Many scenes of the series are taken from real life.

I am against all forms of violence against women.

SevimliTV marks the series as "+16" and It is enough to watch 3 more minutes to understand the end of the movie before the accusations of "immorality". This series is the first work of the director Nasiba Tursunova. Like many filmmakers, SevimliTV supported her and expressed its confidence. We are considering collaborating with her in the future, I am against offending the artist..."

Firdavs Abdukhalikov, General Director of Uzbekistan Cinematography Agency, said:

"Sabriya series, which has been broadcast on SevimliTV channel, is really not very artistic and content. Despite being one of the director's first works of art, it turned out that the television's arts council did not provide the necessary advice and practical assistance.."

References 

2021 Uzbekistani television series debuts
Uzbekistani television series
Uzbek-language television shows